Missouri's third congressional district is in the eastern and central portion of the state. It surrounds but does not include St Louis City.  Its current representative is Republican Blaine Luetkemeyer.

The district took its current form in 2013, when Missouri lost a congressional district as a result of the 2010 census.  At that time, much of the northern portion of the old 9th district was added to the 6th district, while most of the remaining territory became the new 3rd district. The current 3rd district is primarily exurban and rural in character and is the second-wealthiest of Missouri's congressional districts, after the neighboring 2nd district.

From 1953 to 2013, the 3rd had been located in the southern portion of the St. Louis area, including the southern third of St. Louis City, and had a dramatically different political history from the current 3rd.  Its best-known congressman was Dick Gephardt, who represented the district for 28 years until his retirement from Congress.

Changes following 2010 Census
Following a dramatic drop in population of St. Louis in the 2010 United States Census, Missouri lost a Congressional Seat effective in 2013. Redistricting maps indicated that the 3rd district would be dismantled.  The 3rd's home base in St. Louis would be absorbed by Missouri's 1st congressional district.  Much of the district outside the St. Louis area would be drawn into the 8th district.  Meanwhile, the new 3rd included most of the territory currently in the 9th district, which was dissolved.

List of members representing the district

Recent election results

2012

2014

2016

2018

2020

Election from presidential races

Historical district boundaries

See also

Missouri's congressional districts
List of United States congressional districts

References

 Congressional Biographical Directory of the United States 1774–present
 https://web.archive.org/web/20131013222920/http://2010.census.gov/2010census/popmap/

03
Constituencies established in 1847
1847 establishments in Missouri
Constituencies disestablished in 1933
1933 disestablishments in Missouri
Constituencies established in 1935
1935 establishments in Missouri